James Edward Burke (born 25 January 1991) is an English cricketer who played for Surrey County Cricket Club.  He is a right-handed batsman and right arm medium-fast bowler. He made his first-class debut for Somerset against Cardiff MCC University, on 31 March 2012. Burke plays club cricket for Budleigh Salterton CC in the Premier Division of the Devon Cricket League.

Having been released by Somerset at the end of the 2011 season, Burke enjoyed a successful return to the Second XI in 2013 and he was rewarded with a summer contract with Somerset for the 2014 season.

On 1 September 2014, Surrey County Cricket Club announced the signing of Burke on a two-year contract from the end of the 2014 season.

On 25 January 2017, Burke signed for Leicestershire on loan from Surrey for the 2017 season. During the 2017 season Surrey announced that Burke had left the club.

References

External links
 

1991 births
Living people
Cricketers from Plymouth, Devon
English cricketers
Devon cricketers
Somerset cricketers
Surrey cricketers
Leicestershire cricketers